Crew Clothing is a British clothing retailer that specialises in casual wear, shoes and accessories for men and women, selling through stores and by mail order. The company describes its clothes as being British-inspired and influenced by British casual wear, sporting and yachting traditions.

The company was started in 1993 by Alistair Parker-Swift. In the early 1990s, he spent the summer months running a windsurfing school in Salcombe in Devon. During the summer of 1993 he created some navy and white rugby shirts, sourcing the materials from a local supplier. Later he sold clothing at Cowes Week on the Isle of Wight, a regatta event, and then opened a store. The first London store opened on the New King's Road in 1995. As of 2014, the company's chief executive was Louise Barnes and major shareholders included founder Alistair Parker-Swift and private equity group Livingbridge.

Gallery

References

External links 
 

British clothing
Clothing companies of the United Kingdom
1993 establishments in the United Kingdom